James Delea (1868 - 10 July 1950) was an Irish hurler who played as a forward for the Cork senior team.

Delea made his first appearance for the team during the 1891 championship and was a regular member of the starting seventeen until his retirement after the 1897 championship. During that time he won two All-Ireland medals and two Munster medals.

At club level Delea won multiple county club championship medals with Blackrock.

References

1868 births
1950 deaths
Blackrock National Hurling Club hurlers
Cork inter-county hurlers
All-Ireland Senior Hurling Championship winners